The Laguna de las Marites Natural Monument Also Las Marites Lagoon Natural Monument Is a protected area with natural monument status located on the southeast coast of the coastal plain of Margarita Island in Nueva Esparta state in the northwest of the South American country of Venezuela. It was declared a monument on February 27, 1974. It has an extension of 3674 ha, an altitude of 40 msnm and an average temperature of 26 ° C, with hypersaline waters.

Its vegetation is composed of large numbers of black and red lagoons and mangroves. On the coast the vegetation is xerophilous. Its fauna is composed of fish species such as lebranche, horse mackerel, smooth and white shrimp; Also surround the area poultry species such as the pelican, crabs and various herons.

See also
List of national parks of Venezuela
Cerro Santa Ana Natural Monument

References

Natural monuments of Venezuela
Protected areas established in 1974
Tourist attractions in Nueva Esparta
Geography of Nueva Esparta